Ivangorod is a town in Leningrad Oblast, Russia

Ivangorod or Ivangorod may also refer to:
Ivangorod Fortress in the town Ivangorod
Ivangorod, Russian name of the fortress and the village of Dęblin, Poland (1840 - 1915)
Ivangorod, Republic of Bashkortostan, a rural locality (a village) in Davlekanovsky District of the Republic of Bashkortostan, Russia
Ivanhorod, a village in Cherkasy Oblast, Ukraine
Ivanhorod, a village in Zaporizhzhia Oblsat, Ukraine